Yang Jung-yoon (born July 30, 1991), better known by her stage name  Jiyul or Min Ji-yul,  is a South Korean singer and actress. She is a member of the South Korean girl group Dal Shabet.

Early life 
Jiyul was born on July 30, 1991, in Seoul, South Korea. She attended Dongduk Women's University.

Career

2011–2013: Debut with Dal Shabet and solo activities 

Jiyul made her official debut with her fellow members of Dal Shabet on January 3, 2011. On November 3, 2011, Jiyul became a host for SBS MTV's K-Pop 20.

Jiyul made her acting debut as a cameo appearance in Papa in 2012. She played the role of Mila, a top star Park Yong-woo's character manages, who ran away to America, forcing Park's character to go after her.

Her first major acting role was in the short film Her Story, in which she was cast as the female lead.

She participated in MasterChef Korea Celebrity which premiered on February 22, 2013.

2015: Solo activities and departure from Dal Shabet 
In July 2015, it was announced that Jiyul would be acting in a web drama series called 'Yotaek', along with fellow Dal Shabet member Ahyoung and Chinese group Hit5's Gao Yu.

In December 2015, Happy Face Entertainment announced that Jiyul and Gaeun had withdrawn from Dal Shabet after their contract with the agency had officially expired, allowing Jiyul to focus on an acting career.

2016: Acting career 
On October 19, 2016 Jellyfish Entertainment announced that Jiyul had been signed contract with the agency. Jiyul participated in Jellyfish Entertainment's winter project, Jelly Christmas 2016, with her label mates Seo In-guk, VIXX, Gugudan, Park Yoon-ha, Park Jung-ah, Kim Gyu-sun, and Kim Ye-won. The title track, "Falling" was released digitally on  December 13, 2016.

Personal life
In 2013, Jiyul suffered from an ankle injury, which resulted in her not being able to join her Dal Shabet co-members in performing at the WAPOP K-Dream Concert (Wow Asia Pop, Korea Dream Concert), held on October 26.

Filmography

Film

Television drama

Variety show

Discography

As collaborating artist

References

External links 

1991 births
K-pop singers
Living people
South Korean female idols
South Korean women pop singers
South Korean television actresses
South Korean television personalities
Dal Shabet members